Jessica Sonneborn is an American actress, writer, director and stunt double, who is known for starring roles in Bloody Bloody Bible Camp and Dorothy and the Witches of Oz.

Sonneborn worked on many independent films in New England before moving to LA and debuted in The Midnight Shorts Collection (2004) and since then regularly appeared in feature films, direct-to-video productions, TV series, TV mini-series and Short movies. Being a sought-after horror movie actress, she appeared in Detour into Madness Vol. 1, Camp Slaughter, School of Horror, A Lure: Teen Fight Club, Bloody Bloody Bible Camp and recently in House Across The Street (starring Eric Roberts), Piranha Sharks (starring Kevin Sorbo) and her self-written movie Alice D (starring Kane Hodder and Al Snow). She also appeared in popular TV series such as United States of Tara, Hello Ladies and Cuts.

Graduated from Wheaton College with a BA in Anthropology, and Lesley University with a Masters in Education.

Filmography 

2004: The Midnights Shorts Collection
2005: Detour into Madness Vol. 1
2005: Camp Slaughter
2006: Him and Us
2007: School of Horror
2007: Weapons
2009: Spring Breakdown
2010: A Lure: Teen Fight Club
2010: Repo
2012: Money Shot
2012: Dorothy and the Witches of Oz
2013: Rabid Love
2014: Alpha House
2015: Piranha Sharks
2015: The House Across The Street
2016: Never Open The Door
2016: The Haunting of Alice D
2016: Wild Boar
2016: Dog Eat Dog

Awards 

2014: Rhode Island International Horror Film Festival Award – Alice D – Best Feature (Won)
2014: Chicago Horror Film Festival Award- Alice D – Best Writer (Nomination)
2014 IFS Winner Best Horror Movie: Alice D
2014 Shawna Shae Film Festival, Best Horror Film: Alice D

References 

Year of birth missing (living people)
American actresses
American directors
American film producers
American women film producers
American women writers
Living people
Lesley University alumni
21st-century American women
Wheaton College (Massachusetts) alumni